Growth/differentiation factor 5 is a protein that in humans is encoded by the GDF5 gene.

The protein encoded by this gene is closely related to the bone morphogenetic protein (BMP) family and is a member of the TGF-beta superfamily. This group of proteins is characterized by a polybasic proteolytic processing site which is cleaved to produce a mature protein containing seven conserved cysteine residues. The members of this family are regulators of cell growth and differentiation in both embryonic and adult tissues. Mutations in this gene are associated with acromesomelic dysplasia, Hunter-Thompson type; brachydactyly, type C; and osteochondrodysplasia, Grebe type. These associations confirm that the gene product plays a role in skeletal development.

Growth differentiation factor 5 (GDF5) is a protein belonging to the transforming growth factor beta superfamily that is expressed in the developing central nervous system, and has a role in skeletal and joint development.  It also increases the survival of neurones that respond to the neurotransmitter dopamine, and is a potential therapeutic molecule associated with Parkinson's disease.

See also
Chondrodysplasia, Grebe type

References

Further reading

Developmental genes and proteins
TGFβ domain